Kućanec is a village in Croatia.

Populated places in the City of Zagreb